The 2020 All-Ireland Senior Ladies' Football Championship Final is the 47th All-Ireland Final and the deciding match of the 2020 All-Ireland Senior Ladies' Football Championship, an inter-county ladies' Gaelic football tournament for the county teams of Ireland.

There was no audience due to the COVID-19 pandemic. Cork led by a goal at half-time, but Dublin pushed past them in the second half to win a fourth All-Ireland in a row.

Match info

See also
 List of All-Ireland Senior Ladies' Football Championship finals

References

final
All-Ireland Senior Ladies' Football Championship Finals
Ladies' All-Ireland Championship
All-Ireland Senior Ladies' Football Championship Final
All-Ireland Senior Ladies' Football Championship Final, 2020